Sodium–potassium alloy, colloquially called NaK (commonly pronounced ), is an alloy of the alkali metals sodium (Na, atomic number 11) and potassium (K, atomic number 19) that is normally liquid at room temperature. Various commercial grades are available. NaK is highly reactive with water (like its constituent elements) and may catch fire when exposed to air, so must be handled with special precautions.

Properties

Physical properties 
NaK containing 40% to 90% potassium by mass is liquid at room temperature. It is highly reactive with water and is stored usually under hexane or other hydrocarbons, or under an inert gas (usually dry nitrogen or argon) if high purity and low levels of oxidation are required.

A solid compound, exists at low temperatures, containing 46 percent potassium by mass.

NaK has a very high surface tension, which makes large amounts of it pull into a bun-like shape. Its specific heat capacity is 982 J/(kg⋅K), which is roughly one quarter of that for water, but heat transfer is higher over a temperature gradient due to higher thermal conductivity.

Chemical properties 
When stored in air, it forms a yellow potassium superoxide coating and may ignite. This superoxide reacts explosively with water and organics. NaK is not dense enough to sink in most hydrocarbons, but will sink in lighter mineral oil. It is unsafe to store in this manner if the superoxide has formed. A large explosion took place at the Oak Ridge Y-12 facility on December 8, 1999, when NaK cleaned up after an accidental spill and inappropriately treated with mineral oil was scratched with a metal tool. The liquid alloy also attacks PTFE ("Teflon").

Further alloys with low melting points 

Usage

Coolant 
NaK has been used as the coolant in experimental fast neutron nuclear reactors. Unlike commercial plants, these are frequently shut down and defuelled. Use of lead or pure sodium, the other materials used in practical reactors, would require continual heating to maintain the coolant as a liquid. Use of NaK overcomes this. The Dounreay Fast Reactor is an example.

The Soviet RORSAT radar satellites were powered by a BES-5 reactor, which was cooled with NaK. In addition to the wide liquid temperature range, NaK has a very low vapor pressure, which is important in the vacuum of space.

An unintended consequence of the usage as a coolant on orbiting satellites has been the creation of additional space debris. NaK coolant has leaked from a number of satellites, including Kosmos 1818 and Kosmos 1867. The coolant self-forms into droplets of sodium–potassium of up to several centimeters in size. These objects are space debris.

The Danamics LMX Superleggera CPU cooler uses NaK to transport heat from the CPU to its cooling fins.

Desiccant 
In contact with water, hydrogen is created. Hence, sodium–potassium alloys are used as desiccants in drying solvents prior to distillation.

Hydraulic fluid 
Its lubricity is poor, so positive-displacement pumps are unsuitable and centrifugal pumps have to be used. NaK-77 was tested in hydraulic and fluidic systems for the Supersonic Low Altitude Missile. NaK may also be used to transmit forces inside high temperature pressure transducers as an alternative to mercury.

Chemical methods 
NaK can be used as catalyst in some reactions, such as the production of ibuprofen.

Synthesis and production 
Industrially, NaK is produced in a reactive distillation.

See also 
 Liquid metal

References

Fusible alloys
Potassium alloys
Sodium alloys
Desiccants
Coolants
Nuclear reactor coolants
Reducing agents